Freden is a village and a municipality in the district of Hildesheim, in Lower Saxony, Germany. It is situated on the river Leine, approx. 25 km south of Hildesheim. Since 1 November 2016, the former municipalities Everode, Landwehr and Winzenburg are part of the municipality Freden.

Freden was the seat of the former Samtgemeinde ("collective municipality") Freden.

Personalities 
 Friedrich Lorenz (1897-1944), Catholic priest, Nazi opponent
 Friedrich Mennecke (1904-1947), NS doctor who participated in the mass destruction of the so-called euthanasia program of national socialism as an accomplice.

References

External links 

Hildesheim (district)